Chingaari is a 2006 Indian Hindi drama film directed by Kalpana Lajmi. The film is based on the novel, The Prostitute and the Postman by Bhupen Hazarika. This was the fourth to star Mithun Chakraborty in a negative role after Jallaad (1995), Elaan (2005 film) and Classic Dance of Love (2005).

The film is a commentary on the abuse of power and in particular discusses the injustices of the priests in India. Beneath the love triangle between the main characters, there is an age-old story that shows that not even "holy men" are exempt from the corruption of power. Later it was dubbed in Tamil as Peyar Sandhya Thozil Dhasi

Plot 
Basanti (Sushmita Sen) is a prostitute with a child, Titali, working with Ila Arun. Chandan (Anuj Sawhney) is a newly recruited postman. Upon his arrival in the village, he is moved by Basanti's sufferings. The third part of the love triangle is Bhuvan Panda (Mithun Chakraborty), the village priest of the goddess, Kali. He thinks of himself as a god and bends religion as per his will. In the movie, the priest follows some of the aghori rituals and is one of Basanti's regular customers. Bhuvan Panda has a fetish for sadism. Meanwhile, Chandan befriends Titali and Basanti and it is here that Basanti discloses that she wants a better life for her daughter, Titali.

Chandan falls in love with Basanti and promises to give her and Titali a better life. The priest does not approve of the marriage, for obvious reasons. Bhuvan Panda plans to kill Basanti. Chandan tries to stop him and is killed. As this is happening, Basanti awaits her lover at the altar. When he does not arrive, Basanti leaves broken-hearted. In her despair, Basanti returns to her life of prostitution.

When the news of what happened to Chandan reaches Basanti, she and all the villagers attack the temple. In a climactic confrontation between the prostitute and the priest, Bhuvan Panda is killed at the hands of Basanti. The story ends with Basanti avenging the death of her lover.

Cast 
 Mithun Chakraborty ... Bhuvan Panda
 Sushmita Sen ... Basanti
 Anuj Sawhney ... Chandan
 Ravi Gossain ... Chintu
 Jhumma Mitra ... Rupali

Music
"Bichwa Javani Ka Dank Mare" (Male) - Aadesh Shrivastava
"Maha Kali Jai Durge" - Sunidhi Chauhan
"Bana Ley Dulhan Dulhan" - Vijeta Pandit
"Bichwa Javanee Kaa Dank Mare" - Sunidhi Chauhan
"Jab Jab Saiyyan" - Himani Kapoor
"Kitnee Sardee Kitnee Garmee" - Aadesh Srivastava
"Kitni Sardi Kitni Garmi Kitni Barkha Gujar Gayi" - Vijeta Pandit
"Maha Kali Jai Durge" (Male) - Aadesh Shrivastava
"Taandav" - Aadesh Shrivastava

References

External links 
 

2006 films
2006 drama films
2000s Hindi-language films
Films scored by Aadesh Shrivastava
Indian drama films
Films directed by Kalpana Lajmi
Hindi-language drama films